Dihydroxyacetone phosphate (DHAP, also glycerone phosphate in older texts) is the anion with the formula HOCH2C(O)CH2OPO32-.  This anion is involved in many metabolic pathways, including the Calvin cycle in plants and glycolysis. It is the phosphate ester of dihydroxyacetone.

Role in glycolysis
Dihydroxyacetone phosphate lies in the glycolysis metabolic pathway, and is one of the two products of breakdown of fructose 1,6-bisphosphate, along with glyceraldehyde 3-phosphate. It is rapidly and reversibly isomerised to glyceraldehyde 3-phosphate.

   

The numbering of the carbon atoms indicates the fate of the carbons according to their position in fructose 6-phosphate.

Role in other pathways

In the Calvin cycle, DHAP is one of the products of the sixfold reduction of 1,3-bisphosphoglycerate by NADPH. It is also used in the synthesis of sedoheptulose 1,7-bisphosphate and fructose 1,6-bisphosphate, both of which are used to reform ribulose 5-phosphate, the 'key' carbohydrate of the Calvin cycle.

DHAP is also the product of the dehydrogenation of L-glycerol-3-phosphate, which is part of the entry of glycerol (sourced from triglycerides) into the glycolytic pathway. Conversely, reduction of glycolysis-derived DHAP to L-glycerol-3-phosphate provides adipose cells with the activated glycerol backbone they require to synthesize new triglycerides. Both reactions are catalyzed by the enzyme glycerol 3-phosphate dehydrogenase with NAD+/NADH as cofactor.

DHAP also has a role in the ether-lipid biosynthesis process in the protozoan parasite Leishmania mexicana.

DHAP is a precursor to 2-oxopropanal.  This conversion is the basis of a potential biotechnological route to the commodity chemical 1,2-propanediol.

See also
 Dihydroxyacetone
 Glycerol 3-phosphate shuttle

References

Photosynthesis
Alpha-hydroxy ketones
Organophosphates
Phosphate esters
Glycolysis